Rangimoana Taylor is an actor, theatre director, storyteller from New Zealand with more than 35 years in the industry.  He has performed nationally and internationally and was the lead in the feature film Hook Line and Sinker (2011). He was an intrinsic part of three Māori theatre companies, Te Ohu Whakaari and Taki Rua in Wellington and Kilimogo Productions in Dunedin.

Biography 
Rangimoana Taylor was born in Wellington. His mother was  Reremoana Taylor (Shelford). His father Melvin Taylor was a journalist and worked in the diplomatic service. Taylor is affiliated with the iwi Ngāti Porou, Te Whānau a Apanui and Taranaki. The secondary school he attended was  Onslow College in Wellington.

Taylor's first screen acting role was on the first funded New Zealand television series Pukemanu in 1972. Taylor graduated from Toi Whakaari New Zealand Drama School in 1975 with a Diploma in Acting  and was one of the first Māori graduates. Taylor upgraded his qualification to a Bachelor of Performing Arts (Acting) in 2004. Taylor was one of the key people who developed the style of Marae-Theatre, incorporating cultural concepts and values into the performance space. As an educator Taylor also taught at Toi Whakaari New Zealand Drama School.

Taylor founded contemporary Māori Theatre company Te Ohu Whakaari in the 1980s which was a collective that created shows based on their experiences and issues they felt important. Some of the plays of Te Ohu Whakaari were written by Taylors siblings Apirana Taylor and Riwia Brown and included Kohanga (1986) about Māori language revival and kohanga reo. Te Ohu Whakaari toured New Zealand for fifteen years and presented in theatres, marae and schools. 

He was also one of the important contributors to Taki Rua Theatre in Wellington which became a venue for bi-cultural contemporary theatre in the country during the 1980s and 1990s and is a national platform for contemporary Māori theatre. 

In the 1990s Taylor collaborated with Cindy Diver, Awatea Edwin and Hilary Halba to form a bi-cultural theatre company Kilimogo Productions in Dunedin, with Māori and Pākehā traditions present in the process and the performance form. As part of Kilimogo Productions in Dunedin and Timaru Taylor co-produced and co-directed with Hilary Halba Nga Tangata Toa by Hone Kouka in 1997.

As a storyteller Taylor has presented at the National American Storytelling Conference (1997) at Jonesborough, Tennessee and in Brazil in 1998.

Taylor acted along Kirk Torrance and Temuera Morrison a recurring role in the BBC America Mystery drama mini-series Tatau (2015). His lead role role in the film Hook Line and Sinker (2011) was part of an ensemble performance alongside others including Geraldine Brophy and Kate Harcourt. Taylor plays a truck diver who can no longer work due to eye disease.

In 2022 Taylor received the Mayoral Award for Outstanding Contribution to Theatre at the Wellington Theatre Awards.

Performance 
Selected acting r oles in film, television and theatre.

Personal life
Taylor is the brother of leading Māori poet and performance artist Apirana Taylor and writer Riwia Brown, the award-winning screenwriter of the New Zealand movie Once Were Warriors.  He lives in Wellington with his partner, activist, counsellor, and celebrant Bill Logan, who helped lead the campaign for Homosexual Law Reform in the early 1980s.

References

External links
 Contains a description of the concept of Marae-Theatre in Māori culture.

Living people
New Zealand gay actors
New Zealand theatre directors
New Zealand male stage actors
New Zealand male Māori actors
Toi Whakaari alumni
Year of birth missing (living people)
Ngāti Porou people
LGBT theatre directors